Haiku is an album by trumpeter/bandleader Don Ellis recorded in 1973 and released on the MPS label.

Reception

Scott Yanow of Allmusic said "This album is a very different Don Ellis record. Rather than using a big band, the trumpeter is well showcased while backed by a large string section on ten moody originals ...much of the music is quite mellow. A definite change of pace".

On All About Jazz, John Kelman observed "Haiku finds Ellis in largely lyrical territory with a core quintet and varying configurations of a 12-piece string orchestra. Some tracks work better than others, but all point to a musical mind unencumbered by convention, even as he aimed, on other albums, for greater commercial success ...A tad inconsistent, perhaps, but Haiku still possesses more charm than syrup; an alternate, lyrical, and more deeply introspective view of the usually more boisterous Ellis—signaling, perhaps, a new direction that, sadly, he'd not be around long enough to explore further.."

The Guardian's John Fordham noted "This 1973 recording with a strings ensemble is very different from his adventurous work with mind-boggling time signatures in the 60s. But an Ellis venture is never without surprises. All the segments are inspired by haiku, and they reflect that form's brevity. ...The leader's unique brass sound embraced technical security, classical purity and an old jazz-brass swagger, and if some of the music gets a little Disney, it's an object lesson in orchestral writing for improvisers."

Track listing 
All compositions by Don Ellis
 "Children" - 3:30
 "Blossoming" - 3:52
 "Water Jewel" - 5:23
 "Cherry Petals" - 2:47
 "Forest" - 3:30
 "Summer Rain" - 2:20
 "Two Autumns" - 4:57
 "Mirror-Pond of Stars" - 3:25
 "Parting" - 6:18
 "Dew" - 1:28

Personnel 
Don Ellis – trumpet and arranger
Milcho Leviev – keyboards
Larry Carlton (tracks 2 & 7),  David Cohen (tracks 1, 3, 6 & 8), Tommy Tedesco (tracks 4, 9 & 10) – guitar
Ray Brown – bass
John Guerin – drums
Israel Baker, Erno Neufeld, Jacob Krachmalnik, George Kast, George Berres, Gerald Vinci, Shirley Cornell, Marcia van Dyck & Marvin Limonick – violin
Samuel Voghossian, Alfred Barr & Dan Neufeld (tracks 1-3 & 5-8), Allan Harshman, David Schwarz & Myra Kestenbaum (tracks 4, 9 & 10) – viola
Raphael Kramer, Frederick Seykora, Ronald Cooper & Catherine Gotthofer – cello

References 

Don Ellis albums
1974 albums
MPS Records albums